The Worshipful Company of Drapers is one of the 110 livery companies of the City of London. It has the formal name The Master and Wardens and Brethren and Sisters of the Guild or Fraternity of the Blessed Mary the Virgin of the Mystery of Drapers of the City of London. More usually known simply as the Drapers' Company, it is one of the historic Great Twelve Livery Companies and was founded during the Middle Ages.

History

An informal association of drapers had organized as early as 1180, and the first (Lord) Mayor of London in 1189, Henry Fitz-Ailwin de Londonestone, was believed to have been a Draper. The organisation was formally founded in 1361; it received a Royal Charter three years later. It was incorporated as a company under a Royal Charter in 1438 and was the first corporate body to be granted a coat of arms. The charter gave the company perpetual succession and a common seal. Over the centuries the original privileges granted by Royal Charter have been confirmed and amended by successive monarchs. The acting charter of today is that granted by James I in 1607, amended by four supplemental charters, most recently in 2008.

The brotherhood of drapers, a religious fraternity attached to the church of St Mary Bethlehem in Bishopsgate, was founded in honour of the Virgin Mary by "good people Drapers of Cornhill and other good men and women" for the amendment of their lives. The majority of drapers lived in and around Cornhill, Candlewick Street (now Cannon Street) and Chepe (Cheapside). Possibly it was for this reason that their allegiance was transferred to St Mary le Bow in Cheapside and later to St Michael, Cornhill, where the company continues to worship today. Despite these changes, the drapers retain the Blessed Virgin Mary as their patron saint.

Originally, the organisation was a trade association of wool and cloth merchants. It has been one of the most powerful companies in London politics.  Over one hundred Lord Mayors have been members of the company; the first, Henry Fitz-Ailwyn, is thought to have been a draper. During the Plantation of Ulster, the company held land around Moneymore and Draperstown in County Londonderry.

Amongst the royalty who have been members of the company, four had not been expected to become a monarch at the time of their birth but were later crowned:
Prince William of Orange, later King William (III & II) of England, Scotland, France and Ireland
Prince Carl of Denmark, later King Haakon VII of Norway
Prince Albert, Duke of York, later George VI, King of Great Britain and Ireland, Emperor of India
Princess Elizabeth of York, later Queen Elizabeth II of the United Kingdom
Other well-known members have included Prince Frederick, Duke of York and Albany, Sir Francis Drake, Admiral Lord Nelson and Grinling Gibbons.

Queen Elizabeth II of the United Kingdom (who was elected to the Court of Assistants in 2017, on the occasion of the 70th anniversary of her membership of the Company), King Harald V of Norway, The Prince of Wales, The Duchess of Gloucester, Admiral Lord Boyce, and Lady Victoria Leatham (who was elected the first female Master of the company in 2012) are among the many distinguished current members of the company.

Present

Today, the company operates as a charitable, ceremonial and educational institution.  This has included providing the site and some of the buildings of Queen Mary University of London, the library at Bangor University, the Radcliffe Science Library in Oxford, the Science Library at Cardiff University, and the site and the original nineteenth-century buildings of Bancroft's School.  It also administers three almshouses: Queen Elizabeth College Greenwich, Edmanson's Close Tottenham and Walter's Close Southwark.  It provides the chairman and four other governors of Bancroft's School, who use the Drapers' coat of arms and motto. It is the co-sponsor of Drapers' Academy in Harold Hill, which uses a similar logo. 

It has maintained long-standing close ties with Kirkham Grammar School located near Preston in Lancashire.

The Company founded two girls' schools: in Llandaff and Denbigh, Wales, using the endowment of Welsh merchant Thomas Howell, who bequeathed a sum of money to the foundation. Both schools were independent and separate institutions but the Company still has a representative in the governing body of the former.  The company also has close links with some eighteen other educational establishments, ranging from Oxbridge colleges to a primary school. It administers charitable trusts relating to relief of need, education and almshouses; it provides banqueting and catering services; and it fosters its heritage and traditions of good fellowship. The Court of Assistants is its governing body.

The Drapers' Company continues to play a role in the life of the City. Its liverymen carry out important functions in the elections of the governance of the City and its offices.

Livery hall

The Drapers' Company is based at Drapers' Hall located in Throgmorton Street, near London Wall. The company has owned the site since 1543, when it purchased the London mansion of Thomas Cromwell, of Austin Friars, from King Henry VIII. Cromwell had been attainted and executed in 1540.

The building was destroyed in the Great Fire of London and rebuilt to designs by Edward Jarman. After another fire in 1772, it was rebuilt again. This time the architect was John Gorham. Further extensive alterations were made in the 19th century.  The hall survived the Blitz during the Second World War.

The hall includes four finely decorated main rooms used for the company's functions. The largest room is the Livery Hall, which can accommodate up to 276 guests for dinner. These rooms are also available for hire and have often been used for film locations, including for The King's Speech, GoldenEye, The Lost Prince and Agent Cody Banks 2: Destination London.  Groups may book a guided tour of Drapers' Hall; a donation to the company's charitable work is requested.

Church
 St Michael's Cornhill

Collections
The company's archives, works of art, silver and artefacts are in the care of the archivist. The document collection has items dating to the 13th century, including charters and coats of arms, charity records and records of the company's landholdings, including the Londonderry estates. The silver collection includes an ancient Celtic decorative collar found on the Londonderry estate and pieces of the company's own silverware from the 16th century onwards. There is also a collection of paintings, mostly of former members. Researchers may view its collections by appointment.

See also
 Coat of arms of the Drapers' Company
 Drapers' Gardens
Sukiennice, or Drapers' Hall, Renaissance landmark of Kraków, Poland

References

External links
 The Drapers' Company

Great Twelve City Livery Companies
1361 establishments in England
Clothing companies based in London
Queen Mary University of London
Companies of medieval England
Grade II* listed livery halls